Rathcoole Aerodrome  is located in Rathcoole,  west of Mallow, in County Cork, Ireland.  This aerodrome, which has a single grass-strip runway, is licensed by the Aeronautical Services Department of the Irish Aviation Authority. It is operated by Rathcoole Flying Club.

Facilities 

References

External links
 Corks' Airfields - Rathcoole (EIRT) (archived)

Airports in the Republic of Ireland
Transport in County Cork